Anderson dos Santos (born 29 December 1985), known as Kanu is a Brazilian footballer. who plays for Suphanburi.

Honours

Buriram PEA
Thai Premier League (1): 2011
Thai FA Cup (1) : 2011
Thai League Cup (1): 2011

References
 Profile

External links
 Buriram PEA
  

1987 births
Living people
Brazilian footballers
Brazilian expatriate footballers
Criciúma Esporte Clube players
Buriram United F.C. players
Chonburi F.C. players
Shimizu S-Pulse players
Thai League 1 players
Expatriate footballers in Thailand
Expatriate footballers in Japan
Brazilian expatriate sportspeople in Thailand
Association football central defenders
Association football defenders